Michael Samuels is British television director, producer and writer.

He directed  Any Human Heart   for which he won a BAFTA, and in 2018 he won an International Emmy for Man in an Orange Shirt. He also won a Royal Television Society Award for The Curse of Steptoe. Other works include The Falklands Play, The Vice, The Last Days of Lehman Brothers, Mrs. Mandela, The Fear,  Black Work and Close To Me. 

Samuels directed The Windermere Children, broadcast simultaneously in the UK on the BBC and in Germany on ZDF on 27 January 2020, about the child refugees who survived the concentration camps and were taken to the English Lakes District in an attempt to rehabilitate them. The film was nominated for a BAFTA in 2021, and won the Prix Europa Award for Best European Television Movie of the year.

References

External links

Jewish Chronicle 2 December 2010 "Michael Samuels directs a star-studded series for ITV" (includes photo of Samuels)

British television directors
Living people
Year of birth missing (living people)